Faridkot is a village in Depalpur Tehsil in the Okara District of the Punjab province of Pakistan. The village has been a fertile recruiting ground for Lashkar-e-Taiba; Ajmal Kasab, a perpetrator of the November 2008 Mumbai attacks, belonged from Faridkot.

References

Villages in Okara District